Martha Denny (1505 – 9 January 1572) was an English Catholic recusant, sent to prison in 1562 for having attended mass. Her husband was Sir Wymond Carew, by whom she had either 16 or 19 children, including lawyer Sir Matthew Carew.

Family and marriage 
Martha was born in 1505, the daughter of Sir Edmund Denny, Chief Baron of the Exchequer, and Mary Troutbeck. Her brother was Sir Anthony Denny, a leading member of the Privy Chamber, and a confidant of King Henry VIII of England.

On an unknown date she married Sir Wymond Carew of Antony, Cornwall, by whom she had 16 or 19 children (varying sources), an unknown number of whom survived to adulthood, including:
 Thomas Carew (1527 – 12 February 1565)
 Roger Carew
 George Carew
 John Carew
 Sir Matthew Carew (1531–1618), lawyer; married Alice Rivers, by whom he had issue.
 Anthony Carew
 Harvey Carew
 Prudence Carew married Anthony Brugge or Bridges of West Ham. Anthony was the son of Giles Brugge of West Ham (d. 1557) and Helianor Robbins and grandson of Sir John Brugge (or Bruges), Alderman, Draper and Lord Mayor of London, 1520–1521.
 Temperance Carew (1537 – 9 October 1577)
 Elizabeth Carew (died March 1578/1579) married George Dacres of Cheshunt (1534 -30 September 1580)

Sir Wymond was the treasurer of King Henry's fourth wife, Anne of Cleves. The Carews lived in extravagant style at their  residences in Bletchingley, Surrey, Hertfordshire, and Hackney. When her husband died on 22 August 1549, Martha was left with debts totalling £8,000. As she was unable to pay what was in the 16th century a large sum of money, the manor at Hackney as well as other lands passed to the Crown in 1554.

Recusancy 
Following the loss of her home at Hackney, Denny moved to London, where on 8 September 1562, she was arrested for having attended a Roman Catholic mass. After being tried and convicted, she refused to pay the required fine of marks and was sent to prison for six months. On 4 April 1568, she was arrested a second time for the same offence; this time, however, she received a pardon from Queen Elizabeth.

Martha Denny died on 9 January 1572.

References 

1505 births
1572 deaths
English Roman Catholics
16th-century English women
16th-century Roman Catholics
Martha
Martha
Wives of knights